The molecular formula C34H22O22 (molar mass: 782.52 g/mol, exact mass: 782.060272 u) may refer to:

 Punicalin, an ellagitannin found in pomegranates
 4,6-isoterchébuloyl-D-glucose, an ellagitannin found in Terminalia macroptera

Molecular formulas